Jimmy Pahun (born 15 May 1962) is a French politician who has represented Morbihan's 2nd constituency in the National Assembly since 2017.

Political career 
Pahun was the winning skipper at the Tour de France à la voile in 1992 and the 1996 transatlantic race the Transat AG2R.

Pahun was elected to the National Assembly at the 2017 legislative election as an Independent. In the French Parliament, he is a member of the Democratic Movement and affiliated group.

References

External links 
 National Assembly biography

1962 births
Living people
21st-century French politicians
Democratic Movement (France) politicians
Deputies of the 15th National Assembly of the French Fifth Republic
People from Morbihan
Politicians from Brittany
French sailors
French male journalists
Deputies of the 16th National Assembly of the French Fifth Republic